Rineloricaria longicauda, commonly known as the elongated whiptail catfish, is a species of catfish in the family Loricariidae. It is native to South America, where it occurs in coastal drainage basins between Chuí and Tramandaí in the state of Rio Grande do Sul in Brazil, although it has also been reported from Uruguay. In environments with clear to brown water, slow to moderate water flow, and substrates made of sand or mud, it is frequently found.. The species reaches 13.2 cm (5.2 inches) in standard length and is believed to be a facultative air-breather.

References 

Loricariidae
Fish described in 1983
Catfish of South America
Fish of Brazil
Fish of Uruguay